is a Japanese manga artist. After working as an assistant to Masashi Asaki of Psychometrer Eiji fame, she debuted as a professional manga artist in Hana to Yume in 2001 with her fantasy-action series Soul Rescue. She has since published manga primarily in Hakusensha's  (girls') manga anthologies: Hana to Yume, The Hana to Yume, Hana to Yume Plus, and Bessatsu Hana to Yume. Kanno is best known for her romantic comedy series Otomen, which was adapted into a live-action television drama in 2009. Her historical dark fantasy series Requiem of the Rose King, based on William Shakespeare's Richard III, was adapted into an anime by J.C.Staff in 2022.

Works

Series
  (2001–2002)
  (2003–2004)
  (2003–2004)
  (2003–2005)
  (2005–2006)
  (2006–2012)
  (2013)
  (2013–2022)

Art books
  (Akita Shoten, 15 June 2018)

References

External links

  
 
 Interviews: Hakusensha (2001), Kono Manga ga Sugoi! Web (2015), B&N Sci-Fi & Fantasy Blog (2015),  Anime News Network (2015)

1980 births
21st-century Japanese writers
21st-century Japanese women writers
 
Female comics writers
Japanese female comics artists
Living people
Manga artists from Tokyo
People from Tokyo
Women manga artists